The 1991 World Series of Poker (WSOP) was a series of poker tournaments held at Binion's Horseshoe. The 1991 World Series featured a then-record 18 bracelet events.

Preliminary events

Main Event
There were 215 entrants to the main event. Each paid $10,000 to enter the tournament.  This was the first Main Event to offer a top prize of $1,000,000.

Final table

Other High Finishes
NB: This list is restricted to top 30 finishers with an existing Wikipedia entry.

World Series of Poker
World Series of Poker